Gornja Bistra is a village in Croatia. It is located on the northern slopes of the Medvednica, underneath the ski slopes where the Snow Queen Trophy race is held.

References

Populated places in Zagreb County